In dining, a course is a specific set of food items that are served together during a meal, all at the same time. A course may include multiple dishes or only one, and often includes items with some variety of flavors. For instance, a hamburger served with French fries would be considered a single course, and most likely the entire meal. Likewise, an extended banquet might include many courses, such as a course where a soup is served by itself, a course where cordon bleu is served at the same time as its garnish and perhaps a side dish, and later a dessert such as a pumpkin pie. Courses may vary in size as well as number depending on the culture where the meal takes place.

Meals are composed of one or more courses, which in turn are composed of one or more dishes.

When dishes are served mostly in a single course, this is called service à la française; when dishes are served mostly in separate courses, this is called service à la russe.

Etymology
The word is derived from the French word cours (run), and came into English in the 14th century. It came to be used perhaps because the food in a banquet serving had to be brought at speed from a remote kitchen – in the 1420 cookbook Du fait de cuisine the word "course" is used interchangeably with the word for serving.

See also

 Cookbook
 Culinary arts
 Full course dinner
 hRecipe – a microformat for marking-up recipes in web pages
 Italian meal structure
 List of desserts
 Lists of foods
 Main course
 Recipe
 Sadhya

References

Food and drink terminology